"Right Here" is a song by British drum and bass band Rudimental. It features vocals from Foxes. The song was released in the United Kingdom on 12 August 2013 as the fifth single from their debut studio album, Home (2013).

The song was originally released on 29 April 2013 as a promotional single. The Andy C remix was released two weeks earlier through the Waiting All Night EP. Hot Since 82's remix was also included on his debut studio album Little Black Book.

Music video
A music video to accompany the release of "Right Here" was first released onto YouTube on 5 July 2013 at a total length of six minutes and nineteen seconds. The music video was shot at the Tiger Temple in Western Thailand, which is a Theravada Buddhist temple. It was directed by Josh Cole who had also previously filmed the music video for "Not Giving In". The video features martial artist Master Liu Gao Jie, who fights off poachers played by Chavalit Chaonoi and various others.

Track listings

Charts

Certifications

Release history

References

2013 singles
2013 songs
Foxes (singer) songs
Rudimental songs
Asylum Records singles
Song recordings produced by Rudimental
Songs written by Amir Amor